Eubotrys racemosa (syn. Leucothoe racemosa) is a species of flowering plant in the heath family known by the common names fetterbush, swamp doghobble, and swamp sweetbells.

It is native to the Eastern United States, where its distribution extends along the coastal plain from Massachusetts to Florida to Texas.

Description
Eubotrys racemosa is a shrub growing up to 4 meters tall. The thin, smooth leaves have oval to widely lance-shaped blades with serrated margins. The leaves are 3 to 8 centimeters long, with small and larger leaves occurring together on a branch. The leaves are deciduous.

The inflorescence is a row of bell-shaped white flowers each just under a centimeter long. The fruit is a capsule.

Habitats
This shrub grows in coastal plain habitat among pines such as loblolly, slash, and shortleaf pines, and oak species. It occurs in several habitat types including savanna, forest, bog, and pocosin. The climate is mild in the winter and hot and humid in the summer. It is not tolerant of shade and is usually found in full sunlight. It can be found growing with swamp blackgum (Nyssa sylvatica var. biflora), loblolly bay (Gordonia lasianthus), sweetbay (Persea borbonia), red maple (Acer rubrum), titi (Cyrilla racemiflora), southern white cedar (Chamaecyparis thyoides), hurrahbush (Lyonia lucida), sweet pepperbush (Clethra alnifolia), southern bayberry (Myrica cerifera), and laurelleaf greenbrier (Smilax laurifolia).

The leaves of this plant are poisonous to livestock.

References

External links

USDA Plants Profile
The Nature Conservancy

Vaccinioideae
Flora of the Northeastern United States
Flora of the Southeastern United States
Flora of Texas
Plants described in 1803